Boy Band is an American television music competition series that premiered on June 22, 2017, on ABC. The 10-episode first season features young male vocalists competing to become a member of a new five-piece boy band. The final five boys who form the boy band receive a recording contract with Hollywood Records and perform the band's debut single during the finale. On August 24, 2017, it was announced on the live show that Brady Tutton, Chance Perez, Drew Ramos, Sergio Calderon, and Michael Conor were the new members of the boy band, In Real Life. They performed for the very first time their first single, "Eyes Closed".

Rita Ora hosted the first series, with the Backstreet Boys' Nick Carter, the Spice Girls' Emma Bunton and Timbaland serving as the "architects" who helped guide the contestants throughout the series.

Contestants
ABC released the list of the 30 contestants on June 9, 2017.

Progress chart

 Top 5 Winner
 The group won the challenge.
 The contestant was in the bottom two or three. 
 The contestant was eliminated.

Episodes

Contestants who appeared on other shows
 Chance Perez auditioned for season 11 of America's Got Talent as a member of the band "The WVKE". They were buzzed by Howie Mandel and Heidi Klum, and were heavily criticized by Simon Cowell, ultimately not passing through the audition. Chance later appeared as the character Javier Garcia in Power Rangers Dino Fury.
 Stone Martin, Timmy Thames, and Jon Klaasen all appeared on the third season of The X Factor USA, with Martin and Thames competing as soloists and Klaasen as a member of Forever In Your Mind. They were all eliminated during the Four Chair Challenge. Klaasen also appeared on season 15 of American Idol, making it to the top 50.
 Andrew Bloom previously auditioned for Seasons 14 and 15 of American Idol.
 Zack Taylor previously auditioned for Season 14 of American Idol under the name Zack Kaltenbach, making it to the top 48.
 Cameron Armstrong appeared on the third season of Ex on the Beach.
 Brady Tutton appeared as Brock on the American sitcom show Fresh Off the Boat''.

References

External links

2017 American television series debuts
2017 American television series endings
English-language television shows
American Broadcasting Company original programming
Television series by Matador Content
2010s American music television series
Music competitions in the United States
2010s American reality television series